Dolenja Vas pri Temenici is a small settlement on the right bank of the Temenica River in the Municipality of Ivančna Gorica in central Slovenia. The area is part of the historical region of Lower Carniola and is included in the Central Slovenia Statistical Region.

Name
The name of the settlement was changed from Dolenja vas to Dolenja vas pri Temenici in 1953. In the past the German name was Niederdorf.

References

External links
Dolenja Vas pri Temenici on Geopedia

Populated places in the Municipality of Ivančna Gorica